Boston Reid (born December 29, 1982) is a USAC and NASCAR driver.

Early life and education
Reid was born in Logansport, Indiana, where his father Lynn Reid, a former Indy car chief, was the Honda Motorcycle dealer; he later moved his shop to Kokomo, Indiana.  Reid is a 2001 Graduate of Taylor High School. Reid began racing at the age of seven before moving on to the World Karting Association two years later. By the time he was twelve years old, he was racing 80cc go-karts and mini-sprint cars under the tutelage of his father.

Professional racing career
In 1995, Reid won the Rookie of the Year division in the Mini Sprint 600cc division at Miami County Speedway. He won the track championship at that track over the next two years. In 1999, Reid moved to the Great Lakes Outlaw Sprint Series, a sprint car division based in the MidWest. He drove the George K. Devine Special number 9 to several race wins over the next two years. Reid garnered more awards, the 2002 USAC Sprint Car Rookie of the Year, and the National Sprint Car Hall of Fame Non-Wing Rookie of the Year. He got his first win that year at Eldora Speedway.

He would go on to race in France as part of the Red Bull Racing Formula One program, where he was signed to a sponsorship deal. In 2004, Reid signed a driver development contract with Hendrick Motorsports. He made his Busch Series debut later that year at Richmond International Raceway with NEMCO Motorsports, finishing 37th after a crash. He made two more starts that year. In 2005, he raced seven races for Hendrick in the Busch Series. His best race was at Nashville Superspeedway, where he started and finished seventeenth. Unfortunately, he was released from his contract at Hendrick at the end of the year.

In 2006, Reid was a rookie in the Craftsman Truck Series circuit with the new Woodard Racing team. He had run 20 races with a best finish of 13th when he was replaced by Damon Lusk.

Before working with Hendrick's development program, Reid was mentored by four-time Winston Cup champion Jeff Gordon and his father, Lynn.

Personal life
Reid is currently a successful Real Estate agent in Charlotte, North Carolina, and Founding Partner of Lead 2 Real Estate Group, (started in 2011), a firm that specializes in assisting the racing community with their real estate needs. He is married to Shanda, they have one son Hudson (born in 2012) and as of 2014, they announced they expecting another in March 2014.

Motorsports career results

NASCAR
(key) (Bold – Pole position awarded by qualifying time. Italics – Pole position earned by points standings or practice time. * – Most laps led.)

Busch Series

Craftsman Truck Series

ARCA Re/Max Series
(key) (Bold – Pole position awarded by qualifying time. Italics – Pole position earned by points standings or practice time. * – Most laps led.)

References

External links
 
 

1982 births
ARCA Menards Series drivers
Living people
NASCAR drivers
Sportspeople from Kokomo, Indiana
Racing drivers from Indiana
Hendrick Motorsports drivers
USAC Silver Crown Series drivers